Miracle Whip is a sauce condiment manufactured by Kraft Heinz and sold throughout the United States and Canada. It is also sold by Mondelēz International (formerly also Kraft Foods) as "Miracel Whip" throughout Germany. It was developed as a less expensive alternative to mayonnaise in 1933.

History
Premiering at the Century of Progress World's Fair in Chicago in 1933, Miracle Whip soon became a success as a condiment for fruits, vegetables, and salads. Its success was bolstered by Kraft's advertising campaign, which included sponsorship of a series of two-hour radio programs. At the end of its introductory period, Miracle Whip was outselling all mayonnaise brands.

According to Kraft archivist Becky Haglund Tousey, Kraft developed the product in-house, using a patented "emulsifying machine", invented by Charles Chapman, to create a product that blended mayonnaise and less expensive salad dressing, sometimes called "boiled dressing" and "salad dressing spread". The machine, dubbed "Miracle Whip" by Chapman, ensured that the ingredients, including more than 20 spices, were thoroughly blended.

Another story claims that Miracle Whip was invented in Salem, Illinois, at Max Crosset's Cafe, where it was called "Max Crossett's X-tra Fine Salad Dressing", and that Crosset sold it to Kraft Foods in 1931 for $300. While stating that Kraft did buy many salad dressings, Tousey disputes the claim that X-tra Fine was Miracle Whip.

Since 1972, Miracle Whip has been sold as Miracel Whip in Germany. It was formerly produced by Kraft Foods, and is now made by Mondelēz International, in Bad Fallingbostel.

Ingredients and nutrition

Miracle Whip is made from water, soybean oil, high-fructose corn syrup, vinegar, modified corn starch, eggs, salt, natural flavor, mustard flour, potassium sorbate, spice, and dried garlic. The original Miracle Whip is produced using less oil compared to traditional mayonnaise, thus has around half of the calories. Due to added corn syrup it is also sweeter compared to mayonnaise.

Advertising

Six Flags announced a new partnership with the Miracle Whip brand in 2009.

In the late 2000s and early 2010s, Miracle Whip attempted to appeal to younger audiences, with Miracle Whip advertising featuring prominently in the Electronic Arts video game Skate 3, including a dedicated trick, contest, and an achievement called Don't Be So Mayo. 
Kraft paid Lady Gaga to include Miracle Whip in the music video for her song "Telephone". Television adverts described Miracle Whip as an alternative to "real boring" mayonnaise. Criticism by Stephen Colbert led to Miracle Whip buying ad time on his show, The Colbert Report, and attacking Colbert for being a "mayo lover". This also included publishing an open letter stating the attack was "raising hell, man". Eventually, this advertising was dropped.

In 2018, the town of Mayo, Florida, temporarily changed its name to Miracle Whip as a promotional stunt.

See also
Salad cream, a British creamy yellow condiment

References

External links

 

Kraft Foods brands
Mondelez International brands
Products introduced in 1933
Salad dressings
Brand name condiments
Canadian cuisine
Cuisine of Chicago
Condiments